State Road 187 (NM 187) is a state highway in the US state of New Mexico. NM 187's southern terminus is in Hatch, at NM 26 and NM 187's northern terminus is at I 25 Bus. Loop 11 in Williamsburg.

Route description

NM 187 begins at NM 26 in Hatch and starts traveling northward. It then intersects Interstate 25 (I-25) and U.S. Route 85 (US-85) by Caballo Lake. It then intersects NM 152 in Hillsboro. It then ends at I-25 Bus. in Williamsburg.

Major intersections

See also

 List of state roads in New Mexico

References

External links

187
Transportation in Doña Ana County, New Mexico
Transportation in Sierra County, New Mexico